Kathan Patel (born 31 October 1996) is an Indian cricketer. He made his List A debut for Gujarat in the 2017–18 Vijay Hazare Trophy on 11 February 2018.

References

External links
 

1996 births
Living people
Indian cricketers
Place of birth missing (living people)
Gujarat cricketers